The Meitivs are a family living in Silver Spring, Maryland that became a subject of public controversy in 2015 for allowing their children, ages 6 and 10, to go to and from a local park on their own, and for two encounters with government authorities who accused the Meitivs of neglect for this reason.

Incidents 
 On December 20, 2014, Danielle and Alexander (Sasha) Meitiv let their 10-year-old son and 6-year-old daughter walk home together from a local park without supervision. About halfway through the walk, the children were stopped by the police and driven home after someone reported seeing them alone. The encounter led to Montgomery County Child Protective Services (CPS) investigating the Meitivs for neglect.
 On April 12, 2015, Danielle and Alexander let their children play at a local park without supervision. They dropped them off at 4 p.m. and told them to come home within two hours. Police received a call to check on the children at 4:58 p.m. and took them into custody. At 7:18 p.m. the police took them to CPS, where they were held without being allowed to contact their parents. Neither the police nor CPS contacted the children's parents directly, and they only located their children later by calling 9-1-1.
 In June 2015, Maryland officials clarified their views about children playing or walking alone outdoors in a new policy directive, saying Child Protective Services should not be involved in such cases unless children have been harmed or face a substantial risk of harm.

Debate 
The Meitivs' parenting style has been described as "free range parenting," although Danielle has disputed that label, saying, "It's just parenting, period. I did it as a kid. My parents did it."

The encounters between the Meitivs and the government have led to an intense debate among parents and educators.

References 

Families from Maryland
Parenting in the United States
Play (activity)